Labeobarbus humphri is a species of ray-finned fish in the genus Labeobarbus from the Democratic Republic of the Congo where it is only known from one location.

References 

humphri
Taxa named by Keith Edward Banister
Fish described in 1976
Endemic fauna of the Democratic Republic of the Congo